Species Deceases is an extended play by Australian rock music group, Midnight Oil, which was released on 26 November 1985 under the CBS record label. Species Deceases debuted at No. 1 on the Australian Kent Music Report Singles Chart for six weeks from December 1985 to January 1986. It was the first Australian single and/or EP to reach the number-one spot on its chart appearance and remains Midnight Oil's only No. 1 on the national singles chart.

Background
On 26 November 1985, Australian rock music group, Midnight Oil, released a four-track extended play, Species Deceases. At the time Midnight Oil consisted of Peter Garrett on lead vocals and harmonica; Peter Gifford on bass guitar and backing vocals; Rob Hirst on drums and backing vocals; Jim Moginie on lead guitar and keyboards; and Martin Rotsey on lead guitar. It was produced with Francois Kevorkian at Paradise Studios, Darlinghurst for Sprint Music and distributed by the CBS/Columbia label. Species Deceases became a big favourite of FM Radio around the world, with all four songs enjoying frequent airplay, sometimes all of them played back-to-back.

According to Australian musicologist, Ian McFarlane, Species Deceases, with the track "Hercules", featured "a stripped-back pub-rock sound. In terms of sheer sonic firepower, it was one of the band's hardest hitting works".

A line from the song "Blossom and Blood" appeared in the message that got flashed on infected computers by the worm WANK: "You talk of times of peace for all and then prepare for war."

Trivial Note
Species Deceases was certified platinum on 14 December 1985, two weeks after its release.

Track listing

Charts

Weekly charts

Year-end charts

Certifications

Personnel
Midnight Oil
 Peter Garrett – lead vocals, harmonica
 Peter Gifford – bass guitar, backing vocals
 Rob Hirst – drums, backing vocals
 Jim Moginie – lead guitar, keyboards
 Martin Rotsey – lead guitar

Production work
 Producer – Midnight Oil, Francois Kevorkian
 Engineer – David Price
 Assistant – Tom Colley
 Mixer – David Price, Midnight Oil
 Studio – Paradise Studios, Darlinghurst

Art work
 Artwork concept – Midnight Oil, Philip Ellett

Credits:

References

External links
 

1985 EPs
Sprint Music EPs
Columbia Records EPs
Midnight Oil EPs
Number-one singles in Australia
Albums produced by François Kevorkian